Park View High School was a public high school located in South Hill, Virginia community in Mecklenburg County, Virginia. It is part of the Mecklenburg County Public Schools and opened in 1955.  It closed in 2022.  Athletic teams compete in the Virginia High School League's AAA Southside District in Region I.

Enrollment History

External links
 Park View High School

References 

Schools in Mecklenburg County, Virginia
Public high schools in Virginia
Educational institutions established in 1955
1955 establishments in Virginia